Giacomo Porfida or Giacomo Purfida (died 1480) was a Roman Catholic prelate who served as Bishop of Ariano (1463–1480) and Bishop of Lacedonia (1452–1463).

Biography
On 11 August 1452, Giacomo Porfida was appointed during the papacy of Pope Nicholas V as Bishop of Lacedonia.
On 8 April 1463, he was appointed by Pope Pius II as Bishop of Ariano.
He served as Bishop of Ariano until his death in 1480.

References

External links and additional sources
 (for Chronology of Bishops) 
 (for Chronology of Bishops) 

15th-century Italian Roman Catholic bishops
Bishops appointed by Pope Nicholas V
Bishops appointed by Pope Pius II
Bishops of Ariano
1480 deaths